Bertrand may refer to:

Places 
 Bertrand, Missouri, US
 Bertrand, Nebraska, US
 Bertrand, New Brunswick, Canada
 Bertrand Township, Michigan, US
 Bertrand, Michigan
 Bertrand, Virginia, US
 Bertrand Creek, state of Washington
 Saint-Bertrand-de-Comminges, France
 Bertrand (1981–94 electoral district), in Quebec
 Bertrand (electoral district), a provincial electoral district in Quebec

Other 
 Bertrand (name)
 Bertrand (programming language)
 Bertrand (steamboat), an 1865 steamboat that sank in the Missouri River
 Bertrand Baudelaire, a fictional character in A Series of Unfortunate Events
 Bertrand competition, an economic model where firms compete on price
 Bertrand's theorem, a theorem in classical mechanics
 Bertrand's postulate, a theorem about the distribution of prime numbers
 Bertrand, Count of Toulouse (died 1112)
 Bertrand (film), a 1964 Australian television film

See also 
 Bertrand Gille (disambiguation)
 Bertram (disambiguation)